William J. "Billy" Butcher, or "Billy the Butcher", is a fictional character and antihero in the comic book and Amazon Prime series The Boys, created by Garth Ennis and Darick Robertson. He is the leader of The Boys, a group of CIA-sponsored vigilantes (consisting of Wee Hughie, Mother's Milk, Frenchie, and the Female) who observe, record and sometimes liquidate "Supes" (i.e. "superpowered" or "superhuman" individuals, often acting as "superheroes") artificially created by the mega-conglomerate Vought. He is the Homelander's archenemy, who he blames for the rape and death of his wife Becky, while also developing an intense hatred for all superhuman beings. He is the final antagonist of the comic book series.  

Butcher is portrayed by Karl Urban in the Amazon Prime Video streaming adaptation, and voiced by Jason Isaacs and Kay Eluvian in animation.

Appearances

Comic book series

The Boys and Herogasm

As a boy growing up in London's East End, Butcher watched his father physically abuse his mother on a daily basis, developing an overwhelming hatred for the older Butcher and almost leading him to murder. His younger brother Lenny talked him down, but only because of the impact it would have on their mother. Butcher went on to serve in the Royal Marines and was wounded in the Falklands War. Following his deployment, Butcher became self-destructive, drinking excessively and assaulting friends and strangers for little reason (even being court-martialed at one point). This changed the day he met his future wife, Becky Saunders. Following that, there was no record of any assaults; Mallory believes Becky's presence had a calming effect on Butcher. Conversely, the cause of Butcher's campaign against superheroes stems from the rage he felt after the rape and death of his wife at the hands of a "supe". Following a strange period of emotional distance between the two of them, Butcher awoke to find his wife disemboweled on their bed, with her prematurely born, superpowered child floating above her; after it attacked Butcher with its heat vision, Butcher beat it to death with a lampstand. The loss of his wife shattered Butcher's tranquility and re-awakened his old demons. After being taken into custody, he read Becky's diary (provided by Mallory) and discovered that his wife had apparently been raped by the world's premier superhero, The Homelander. After blinding a U.K. government official who threatened Butcher with incarceration if he did not go along with a cover story for Becky's death, Butcher was recruited to join Mallory in the enterprise that would later evolve into the Boys.

According to #50: At the time of the Boys' original disbanding, taking place some months after the events of 9/11, Butcher had stated that he had been working for Mallory for 15 years. This indicates that he began around 1986. Butcher and Mallory operated as a pair for several years, until an operation against a high-profile target (Web-Weaver, hinted at being the Boys' incarnation of Spider-Man), resulted in increased support in the team. In #55, Mallory tells Wee Hughie that Butcher recruited Mother's Milk, and subsequently the Frenchman and the Female (most likely for their willingness to commit violent acts). As time passed, Butcher slowly began to take control of the group, gradually increasing the level of violence the Boys used against Supes, often manipulating events until lethal force was the only option.

Butcher is now teetotal, preferring to drink Club Soda, and avoiding the unnecessarily self-destructive behavior of his youth (which had been fueled by alcohol), semi-regularly checking in with his sponsor and former drinking buddy Proinsias. Butcher also seems happy to help out a friend in need, even if it means he takes a beating in the process, telling M.M. after one such beating "It only hurts when I laugh... Hahahahaha". At the same time, M.M. has noted that Butcher never brings this up, instead leaving it hanging over M.M.'s head (as motivation). He seems genuinely fond of Hughie, but at the same time he has deliberately put Hughie into situations where he would have to use violence or kill an opponent, and rarely keeps him in the loop or will engage in one-upsmanship with him. Later, Hughie figures out that it was meant to toughen him up in the face of what the Boys do, and the mental games are likely due to Billy's awareness of Hughie's intuition and skill as an amateur detective. While Butcher seems at times callous with how he deals with his team, openly referring to the Frenchman and The Female as insane, Butcher is willing to take on a job by himself rather than risk losing the team on an operation, as seen when he takes on Payback by himself to cover the team's escape, and his unwillingness to allow anyone else accompany him into the White House to confront Homelander.

A bulldog named Terror is his constant companion; this dog has been trained to have sex with anything at Butcher's command ("Terror...Fuck it.") Butcher is extremely protective of Terror, even going as far as threatening the Homelander with breaking a truce after the Homelander moves to attack Terror for urinating on his leg in #20. In that same story, Homelander questions Butcher's motivations and, although Butcher does not verbally respond, the Homelander examines Butcher's pulse and heartbeat and hypothesizes that the Boys' war against superheroes is all that Butcher has to live for, a war that he does not expect to survive. Similarly, Mallory sees that what he unintentionally gave Butcher upon his recruitment into the Boys was a never-ending war which would constantly allow him to exercise the violent part of his being.

At the final clash in Washington, Butcher learned that it was Black Noir who'd killed his wife rather than the Homelander, and he finally gained his revenge. In issue #68, it was revealed that he'd secretly been making more of the modified Compound V from #11–14 (which can be triggered to kill superhumans) so that, if he survived, he could kill vast numbers of potential superhumans. The battle for Washington was won because Butcher had information about how to guide missiles towards the neurons in superhuman brains, that and the Compound V made Mother's Milk suspect that Butcher had faked Vogelbaum's death and was using him to develop more for himself.

After Washington, revealing his plans to use his Compound V to kill all potential superhuman in an act of genocide, numbering billions of people. Butcher murders their ally Vas (Love Sausage) to cover up his plan, then murders the Legend to prevent any information from reaching Hughie. Butcher suddenly announces a three-month leave for the team, revealing his intention to make Hughie his second-in-command (as Hughie had once asked for, however Hughie admits to having forgotten asking about it), to damage intra-group communication. It also comes out that he killed Milk's ex-wife in front of his daughter in order to prevent Milk from journeying to Los Angeles to deal with her. After confirming with Milk that he would not be on board with Butcher's plan, Butcher apologises to Milk and kills him, before using an explosion to kill Frenchie and the Female.

Having discovered his plan, Butcher is later confronted by Hughie on top of the Empire State Building, and after a brief fight, they both fall onto a lower platform, whereupon Butcher breaks his neck, becoming paralyzed from the neck down. After a brief conversation with Hughie wherein he acknowledges his past and admits to having killed Mother's Milk, Frenchie, and the Female, a police helicopter shows up. Knowing he will be locked away for life as an invalid, Butcher deceives Hughie into killing him by falsely claiming he had murdered Hughie's parents. Hughie, in a fit of rage, rams a metal spike into Butcher's chest, killing him. True to character, Billy dies smiling.

Butcher, Baker, Candlestickmaker
In Butcher, Baker, Candlestickmaker, Butcher's background is explored, as he reminisces on his life whilst attending his father's funeral, talking to his corpse about his time spent serving in the British Army and special forces, fighting in the Falklands War, meeting and marrying his wife Becky, and joining the CIA and founding the Supe-focused black ops group The Boys following her death. Concluding with a statement on how much he had always hated his father despite not seeing him in twenty years, Butcher urinates on his corpse.

Dear Becky
In Dear Becky, set twelve years after Butcher's death, Hughie is sent Butcher's diary by an unknown individual, leading him to confront his past actions and killing Butcher. As Hughie reads through the diary, Butcher's past actions and moral justifications are elaborated upon, including torturing and murdering renegade Supes (including children), and how he developed his plans for a genocide focused on Supes. Ultimately, Rayner is revealed to have sent Hughie the diary in an attempt to intimidate him so she could restart her political campaign; Hughie then reveals that Butcher had had proof of the various war crimes she had committed which he kept to himself, instead having chosen to posthumously ruin her career with a sex scandal.

Television series

The Boys (2019–present)

In the streaming television series adaptation, Karl Urban portrays the character. Unlike the comic series, Butcher has a beard, although he was clean shaven until his wife disappeared, presumed dead, with Butcher mistakenly believing that Homelander killed her, while seeking to take down Vought International as a whole as a result.

Season One (2019)

In season one, Billy is first seen in "The Name of the Game", when he heads to the shop where Hughie Campbell works and (under the guise of being an FBI agent) offers him the opportunity of vengeance on Vought International and their "Supe" superheroes after the former's girlfriend was murdered accidentally by the Supe known as A-Train. Although reluctant at first, Hughie eventually accepts and is taken by Billy into a secret location where Billy tells him about The Boys. 

After some convincing, Billy finally manages to get Hughie to join his cause and takes him to the Vought headquarters the following day under the guise of getting an apology out of A-Train when in actuality he was instead placing a listening device into the conference room of Vought's premier superhero team, The Seven. Unfortunately however, Hughie is caught in the act by the Supe Translucent, who follows him back to the store and attempts to kill him, only for Butcher to save Hughie, and incapacitate and then kidnap Translucent. With nowhere to go, he seeks out the help of old-friend Frenchie. Frenchie is at first angry that Butcher has come to him, however the two reconcile and end up figuring a way to kill Translucent; Hughie is the one who ends up pulling the trigger, however.

Shortly after Translucent's death, Butcher approaches another old friend, Mother's Milk "MM", asking him to join The Boys again. MM initially refuses, however is convinced by Billy to come back. Not long after, in "The Female of the Species", The Boys find The Female in a basement, having been the subject of Compound V injections for a while. She is ultimately accepted into The Boys despite Butcher believing her to be initially dangerous.

Billy's hate for Supes has been fueled by his personal hate for Homelander, leader of The Seven, following the alleged death of his wife Becca Butcher. Shortly after his wife's disappearance, Grace Mallory approached Butcher, showing him CCTV footage of his wife and Homelander together at Seven Tower. Billy believed that Homelander was the reason she disappeared, presuming that he killed her, fueling a personal vendetta that would last the next eight years.

Unbeknownst to Billy, Becca had been placed into witness protection by Vought International having been pregnant and given birth to Homelander's child — a child with enhanced abilities, including Homelander's heat vision. In "You Found Me", Homelander takes Butcher to see Becca for the first time since her disappearance.

Season Two (2020)

In season two following the events of Butcher, Billy reunites with The Boys. In "Over the Hill with the Swords of a Thousand Men", Butcher steals a yacht and makes a deal with Mallory to transport Kenji to a rendezvous point, in return, Grace will give Butcher Becca's location. As the Boys transport Kenji, tension is still raw between Butcher and Hughie as Hughie punches Butcher for hitting him last time. Furthermore, when The Boys watch a news article about Compound V being exposed to the public, all the members except Butcher enthusiastically congratulate Hughie. Butcher then reminds them all that their work is not done and they must keep their eyes on the ball because "shit can go sideways just like that." Butcher's predictions come true, when The Boys are intercepted by a police helicopter telling them they're under arrest for stealing the yacht. Butcher attempts to reason with the helicopter, however Kenji breaks free from his restraints and attempts to attack Butcher and MM. However Kenji is shoved by Kimiko and instead hits the helicopter with his telekinetic attack. With the helicopter down, Butcher reasons that they have to move now or else more will come. Hughie is reluctant, saying that the police officers could still be alive and they need to check the wreckage, but Butcher reasons the men are already dead and they will be too if they don't keep moving. Things only escalate when the yacht is attacked by The Deep, forcing The Boys to transport Kenji using a spare speedboat on the back. While racing to the shoreline, their path is blocked by a whale, so Butcher rams through it. Determined to stay moving, Butcher commands The Boys to improvise and escape through a nearby Storm drain. Hughie however is reluctant and in shock, but eventually follows behind. The Seven arrive, Homelander and Starlight corner Hughie. Butcher then distracts Homelander long enough for Kenji to round the corner and neutralize Homelander by burying him in rubble. The Boys fail to recover Kenji and transport him, as Kenji is killed by Stormfront.

Butcher meets Grace at a memorial shrine for the 59 apartment tenants who were killed by Stormfront. She explains to Butcher that she has a reoccurring dream: She is on a stage at Carnegie Hall and everyone whoever got killed by a Supe is in the audience just staring at her. Butcher then apologizes for hitting a dead end on the investigation of Susan Raynor's death, but Grace only denies it that sorry isn't enough. Grace then gives Butcher information on an eye witness who knows about Liberty and tells him to give it to Mother's Milk. Grace stops Butcher and gives him Becca's location. Confused, Butcher asks why give it to him if he failed to deliver the terrorist. Mallory apologizes to Butcher, that she's sorry that she was the reason Butcher stopped searching for Becca by replacing it with a vendetta against Homelander. Furthermore, Grace expresses that she would like to have "one less audience member staring at her".

Butcher uses the information given to him to find the facility Becca is living in. Butcher climbs the fence and finds Becca. The two have sex and catch up on being separated for the last 8 years. Butcher reasons they have to escape and can uses a garbage truck for them to escape. When the day comes, Becca is reluctant to leave. She reasons that no matter what happens, Butcher will find someway to get rid of Ryan "It won't be obvious and it won't be right way", but he'll find a way. Butcher tries to convince her he wants to help raise Ryan but Becca explains she already knows Butcher's true nature, that he was already broken before she ever entered his life. Becca's assumptions come to light, when Butcher admits to calling Ryan a supe freak and that they should just hand him over to Vought so the two of them can escape and living in hiding. Becca refuses, stating she needs to be there for Ryan, otherwise Vought will only recreate Homelander. Butcher tries to plead with her, but Becca just gets into her car. Butcher attempts to stop her, but she activates an alarm and warns him to leave because every guard will arrive at his location in 60 seconds. Butcher leaves the compound disappointed at what his wife has become.

After Starlight gets her tracker chip removed, she is taken to The Boy's hideout, there she meets up with Butcher. Annie is still mad at Butcher for shooting her with a 50. caliber round, while Butcher is just dismisses her anger and focuses on the information at hand. The Boys investigate The Sage Grove Center, Butcher, Hughie and Starlight wait outside the facility to provide an escape for Frenchie, Mother's Milk, and Kimiko while they infiltrate the facility. Starlight makes an entrance while Butcher aims his rifle at her head, debating whether or not to shoot. He ultimately decides not to. When Starlight returns and offers Butcher a hand down, he refuses it. Infuriated by Butcher's distant attitude and repeated rude behavior, Annie confronts Butcher to the dismay of Hughie. She then incites the argument further by comparing Butcher to Homelander. Before the argument can finish, they're interrupted by the arrival of Stormfront. Once Stormfront leaves, they order the other members to retreat. Unbenounced to them, the facility has enter lockdown with prisoners escaping. One of the patients meets Butcher and Starlight and begs them not to hurt him. The two try to calm the man, but he releases an EMP shockwave knocking them both back and sending the van with Hughie inside, flipping. Butcher kills the patient, and the two rush to check on Hughie. Hughie is fine until they notice a piece of shrapnel in his stomach. Concerned for Hughie, Billy and Annie leave the facility to seek medical help for Hughie, leaving the others to fend for themselves.

Annie hitchhikes to stop a car and begs the driver to help them. The driver notices Butcher's gun and in turn, pulls out a gun and threatens all of them believing they're trying to rob him. Annie draws energy from the man's car and hits him with a blast of energy. They leave the man's body and drive off. Annie confesses that she has become desensitized to civilians getting hurt, earning Butcher's silent respect. The two successfully take Hughie to a hospital and watch over him. The two then bond over how much they know about Hughie, with them both thinking he's too good for them.

Butcher is called by one of the gang members, who informs him they have a visitor. Butcher goes up top to see that Becca has tracked him down. Billy embraces her and she tells him to help her because Homelander took Ryan. Billy and The Boys then plan out how they're going to take down each member of The Seven, should all of them arrive. However, behind Becca's back, Butcher arranges a secret meeting with Stan Edgar.

Butcher meets with Stan Edgar in a restaurant to discuss about Ryan. Butcher is first patted down and assured that there are snipers trained on him. Edgar offers him desserts but Butcher demands to get straight to business. Edgar then asks what he knows about Ryan. Butcher explains that he knows Ryan is Vought's contingency plan in case Homelander steps out of line and that "plan" will fail if Ryan bonds with Homelander. Butcher then offers his assistance in solving that problem. Edgar asks why Butcher would think he would willfully betray his "friend". Butcher says he knows Edgar is ruthless because he knows Vought turns someone like Stormfront into one of America's most beloved Superheroes. Edgar justifies his actions as business progress because Stormfront helped improve their stock prices. Butcher then reminds Edgar that Stormfront should bother him for obvious reasons, to which Edgar revels she does worry him but he chooses not to focus on what he wants. Butcher then challenges Edgar by asking him how he could control Stormfront, however Edgar denies it. Butcher then offers to get Ryan away from Homelander, then he'll call Vought and have them secure Ryan, in return, Vought will do a better job of hiding him. Edgar agrees and promises to relocate Becca and Ryan to a safe place, but Butcher refuses, saying Becca stays with him. Edgar explains Ryan needs his mother, to which Butcher tells Edgar to find a new one. Edgar then asks about if and when Becca tries to find her son. Butcher tells him to say to her that it is the only way to keep Ryan safe from Homelander. Butcher holds out his hand and makes a deal, for Vought to tell him where they are and that he'll secure the boy. Edgar agrees and shakes his hand.

The moment Homelander leaves the cabin to follow Frenchie's distraction, Billy and Becca move in to secure Ryan. They take him and escort him back to the hanger The Boys are hiding at. Billy then changes the plan and orders M.M to escort Becca and Ryan out of the fight before it happens. Becca refuses, asking him why the plan has to change. Billy reveals that he secretly made a deal with Stan Edgar to give up Ryan, and in exchange, him and Becca could live together again. Becca agrees and reluctantly leaves with M.M, however their car is intercepted by the arrival of Stormfront. Billy rushes to the car and helps them out. Billy orders M.M to stay behind with the rest of The Boys and distract Stormfront while he secretly escorts Becca and Ryan.

Stormfront tracks them down in the middle of the forest and demands them to give her Ryan. Billy refuses, so Stormfront neutralizes him with her plasma lightning. Enraged when Becca stabs her eye, Stormfront holds Becca in a chokehold. Billy recovers and attempts to stop Stormfront by shooting her and hitting her head with a crowbar, but it doesn't even faze Stormfront as she continues to choke Becca. Ryan in a panicked state freaks out and uses his laser vision. When Butcher wakens from the attack, he notices a maimed Stormfront, Ryan crying while apologizing, and sees a mortally wounded Becca. Butcher rushes to Becca and holds down her wound, calling out for help but to no avail. Becca demands him to reassure Ryan that this was not his fault and to promise to keep Ryan safe before she closes her eyes and dies. Billy is distraught but intent on keeping his promise to his wife, so when Homelander arrives to take Ryan, Butcher refuses saying he promised Becca. He keeps Ryan in his protection and ends up giving him to Grace Mallory and the CIA, who will keep him somewhere safe.

Season Three (2022)

In season three, in the year following Becca's death, Butcher has continued to lead the Boys under the sponsorship of the Federal Bureau of Superhuman Affairs, albeit without Hughie (now a liaison officer between the Boys and the FBSA) and MM (who wished to spend more time with his daughter, Janine), now headquartered at the Flatiron Building. Butcher has also been sober for the past year, and has served as a surrogate father figure to Ryan. On one mission, where the size-shifting Supe Termite accidentally killed his boyfriend, Butcher saves Frenchie by trapping Termite in a bag of cocaine and forced him to overdose, but decided not to kill him in accordance with Hughie's orders. After learning that Termite would not face charges due to a sponsorship deal between Vought and Terminix, Butcher expresses his anger and frustration over being allowed only to apprehend lower-tier Supes for minor offences.

With Queen Maeve working as an informant for the Boys, she informs him of the existence of a weapon called "B.C.L. Red", which allegedly killed the legendary Supe Soldier Boy in 1984 and which could be used to kill Homelander. She also provides him with vials of V24, an experimental Compound V variant which temporarily grants superpowers for 24 hours. Whilst considering pouring the V24 down the drain, Butcher is visited by Homelander, frustrated with being forced to publicly apologise for his relationship with Stormfront and having to co-captain the Seven with Starlight; begrudgingly empathising with their respective stymied positions, Butcher and Homelander pledge to some day engage in a "scorched earth" fight to the death.

Whilst investigating the former members of Payback, Soldier Boy's team, Butcher approaches Soldier Boy's former sidekick and ward Gunpowder, a gun-toting Supe with expert marksmanship. Attempting to blackmail Gunpowder for information regarding Soldier Boy's death using a copy of a complaint made by him of Soldier Boy's "habitual [physical] abuse" provided by MM, Butcher is wounded and driven off by Gunpowder after a shootout in a parking lot. When considering moving on with his life after watching a Lego animation video made by Ryan and featuring Becca's voice, Hughie informs him that Victoria Neuman, the FBSA director, is the head-popper and Stan Edgar's adopted daughter, that Vought has been controlling opposition to itself via the FBSA, and that to fight Vought they would have to do things "[Butcher's] way". After taking V24, Butcher returns to Gunpowder, successfully beating and interrogating him, demonstrating superpowers including super durability, super strength and laser vision. After learning that Soldier Boy supposed died whilst during a mission in Nicaragua in 1984 supported by the CIA, and that his own mentor Grace Mallory was Payback's case officer, Butcher beats Gunpowder to death before accidentally lasering Gunpowder's corpse and car. Whilst visiting Ryan, Butcher blackmails Mallory into revealing what she knew about Soldier Boy's death, threatening to leak the identities of her agents on Facebook if she did not comply. Mallory reveals that after having to accept the involvement of Payback and Vought in Operation Charly, joint Sandinista and Soviet forces were able to kill Soldier Boy, transporting his body to behind the Iron Curtain. Butcher resents Mallory's undisclosed knowledge of the existence of a weapon which could kill Homelander, believing that Becca's death could have been avoided. Mallory defends her actions by saying either the weapon would not have worked or have compelled Butcher to go on a rampage and kill all Supes, and tells him that he is his father's son. When Butcher storms out, Ryan tries to stop him from leaving, saying that he promised to stay with him, with Butcher defensively snapping at him and blaming him for Becca's death.

Butcher manages to strike a deal with Frenchie's former boss, the dominatrix and gang leader "Little Nina", getting the Boys transport to Russia and the location of B.C.L. Red, in exchange for the assassination of an oligarch, which Butcher forces Kimiko to carry out. Whilst raiding the research lab where B.C.L. Red is allegedly kept, Butcher is forced to use his Temp-V-enabled superpowers, namely his laser vision save the Boys from attacking guards after they run out of ammunition, and his super strength to open the pod containing B.C.L. Red (which is revealed to be Soldier Boy himself, now able to emit radioactive blasts following experimentation by the Russians). With the exception of Hughie, who used it without Butcher's approval or knowledge, the Boys disapprove of the use of Temp-V. After Soldier Boy blasts Kimiko (eliminating her powers in the process) and escapes the facility, and the Boys return to New York, Butcher relays the events of the failed mission to Maeve. Breaking their respective sobrieties and bonding over their mutual hatred of Homelander, Butcher rants about the absolute corruptibility of Supes and his desire to eliminate them all (to which Maeve does not disagree), and the two end up having sex. When Soldier Boy, who managed to smuggle himself into America, is shown on the news to have destroyed the best part of a five-storey brownstone in a radioactive blast, Butcher, Hughie and MM uneasily team-up to track him down. After learning from The Legend, the former Vought Vice President of Hero Management and informant and ally of the Boys, that Soldier Boy was planning to hunt down and kill his former team Payback for revenge, Butcher, Hughie and MM track down and capture Crimson Countess, Soldier Boy's girlfriend and first target. MM, whose grandfather was killed by Soldier Boy, is drugged by Butcher so that he does not interfere with his plan to offer Countess to Soldier Boy as a show of good faith, hoping to team-up with him to kill Homelander. This alienates Butcher from MM, who considers him a hypocrite.

Butcher manages to get Soldier Boy to agree to help him and Hughie kill Homelander by plying him with Vought-a-Burger food, whiskey and Benzedrine, goading him by referring to Homelander as "the new [Soldier Boy]", and agreeing to help him kill the surviving members of Payback in exchange. First going after the TNT Twins, he, Hughie and Soldier Boy travel to their Montpelier residence during the 70th anniversary of "Herogasm", an orgy attended by lower-tier Supes. MM, who along with Starlight had gone there to warn the Twins, is prevented from fighting Soldier Boy (and vice versa) by Butcher. Butcher allows MM to take out his frustration and anger on him without physical injury due to being on V24, and checks that he is still alive after Soldier Boy accidentally destroys the mansion, killing the TNt Twins and many guests, during a PTSD-induced blackout. After Homelander arrives, Butcher, Soldier Boy and Hughie manage to fight and briefly subdue him, although Homelander manages to escape just before Soldier Boy blasted him.

Going after Mindstorm, another former Payback member, Butcher supplies Soldier Boy with a large amount of marijuana to prevent him from experiencing another PTSD blackout. Disorientated by an explosion from a trip-wire-triggered grenade, Butcher is subdued by Mindstorm, put into a trance and forced to relive his worst memories until death by severe dehydration. Wishing to kill Mindstorm, the only one who could revive Butcher, Soldier Boy leaves Butcher for dead, much to Hughie's protestations, believing that Butcher would be willing to die if it meant fulfilling his promise of killing Homelander. Butcher witnesses, in third-person, his memories of the abuse he took from his father in order to protect his younger brother Lenny, his assault on a headmaster after being caught selling marijuana and compared to his father, during which he accidentally hit Lenny, and his brother's pleas to not enlist so to not be left alone to the full brunt of their father's abuse. After Hughie becomes disillusioned with Soldier Boy and has a change of heart, he rescues Mindstorm in order to revive Butcher, in exchange for being teleported to safety. Moments before being revived, Butcher is lambasted by Lenny for getting those closest to him killed, namely him and Becca, and similarly endangering Hughie, and is forced to witness Lenny's suicide. Moments after emerging from his trance, Butcher briefly confuses Hughie for Lenny, and comes to his aid after Soldier Boy punches him in retaliation for rescuing Mindstorm. After Annie informs Butcher that V24 will cause brain lesions and death after three to five doses, she demands that he inform Hughie. However, as Butcher is about to tell him, he instead tells him that they need to go to the Flatiron Building to collect more.

On their way back to New York, Butcher, commenting that Hughie is the "spit[ting image] of [his] little brother", knocks Hughie unconscious and abandons him in a gas station bathroom to prevent him from taking more Compound V. After Soldier Boy learnt from Mindstorm that he is Homelander's biological father, and in turn informing Homelander of the fact, Butcher tells him Homelander is not his "son", saying that "blood don't matter".

Death Battle! (2020)
In the 2020 Amazon Prime Video-sponsored The Boys promotional episodes of Death Battle!, Butcher (voiced by Kay Eluvian) participates in the Seven's battle royale, initially winning via making use of a laser baby, before being summarily crushed by Homelander.

Diabolical (2022–present)
In The Boys Presents: Diabolical episode "I'm Your Pusher", set in the same continuity as The Boys comic book series, Butcher (voiced by Jason Isaacs) confronts OD, a drug dealer who deals directly to Vought supes, and blackmails him into giving tainting the Great Wide Wonder's drugs, causing him to crash into Ironcast during a promotional campaign, killing them both. Laughing in the aftermath, Butcher tells OD about the pair's crimes, before walking away with Wee Hughie.

Short films

Butcher (2020)
The short film Butcher, set between the first and second seasons, follows Butcher on the run after being framed for Stillwell's murder. After seeking help from his old friend Jock, Butcher beats him to death after Jock calls the police on him.

Mr. Butcher (2022)
The short film Mr. Butcher, set between the third and fourth seasons, follows Butcher visiting an elementary school as a guest speaker, teaching children to be wary of Supes, of the many ways they can be killed by them, and encouraging fear and hatred of them in place of admiration.

Powers and abilities
Billy Butcher is a physically fit former SAS special forces operative later employed by the CIA, possessing no superpowers or extraordinary abilities, unless injected with a shot of the enhancement drug Compound V. Each dosage applied to Billy and other members of The Boys is worth 19 billion dollars, allowing Butcher superhuman levels of strength and durability, allowing him to casually injure and kill regular humans as well as "Supe" superhumans. Despite this strength, in the comic books Butcher is most commonly equipped with a crowbar. In the television series, Butcher along with the other members of the Boys (besides the Female) are not injected with Compound V and thus do not have superhuman abilities. In season three, Butcher acquires V24, an unstable variant of Compound V that grants superpowers for twenty four hours. When injected with V24, Butcher is granted superhuman strength, speed, durability, and stamina, along with gold-colored heat vision.

Development
Billy Butcher was designed as a parody of The Punisher, a character that series creator Garth Ennis had written for nine years, prior to creating The Boys. Both characters are family men who become violent, unhinged vigilantes who allow their constant thirst for revenge to take them over completely. The character was originally owned by DC Comics for its first volume until the rights were reverted to Dynamite Entertainment.

Following the story arc where the corrupt superhero problems are dealt with and Homelander and the Seven are defeated, Billy betrays and murders the other members of The Boys and has them killed in order to eliminate all Supes in the world, establishing him as the final antagonist of the series. Hughie Campbell, enraged by this act of betrayal, kills Billy with a glass shard. Despite dying, Billy praises Hughie and dies with a smile on face, and Hughie tells Annie that Butcher is probably fighting in Hell.

Reception
Karl Urban's depiction of Billy Butcher in the Amazon Prime Video streaming television adaptation has been positively received, and his interpersonal relationships with Hughie Campbell (portrayed by Jack Quaid) and Mother's Milk "MM" (portrayed by Laz Alonso) have been praised.

References

The Boys characters
British comics characters
Characters created by Garth Ennis
Comics characters introduced in 2006
DC Comics characters who can move at superhuman speeds
DC Comics characters with accelerated healing
DC Comics characters with superhuman senses
DC Comics characters with superhuman strength
DC Comics male supervillains
DC Comics military personnel
DC Comics supervillains
WildStorm supervillains
Dynamite Entertainment characters
Fictional Central Intelligence Agency personnel
Fictional characters with energy-manipulation abilities
Fictional characters with fire or heat abilities
Fictional characters with X-ray vision
Fictional murderers of children
Fictional immigrants to the United States
Fictional mass murderers
Fictional characters with post-traumatic stress disorder
Fictional people with acquired American citizenship
Fictional Special Air Service personnel
Fictional torturers and interrogators
Fictional war veterans
Male characters in television
Television characters introduced in 2018
Vigilante characters in comics
WildStorm characters
Punisher